Pipiscius zangerli is an extinct species of lamprey that lived about 300 million years ago, during the Middle Pennsylvanian Epoch of the Carboniferous Period.

It has a distinctive crown-like mouth comprising a ring of radially arranged teeth.

It is known from the Mazon Creek fossil beds located in present-day Illinois.

See also

References

External links

Lampreys
Carboniferous jawless fish
Pennsylvanian fish of North America
Carboniferous Illinois
Paleontology in Illinois
Moscovian life
Pennsylvanian first appearances
Pennsylvanian extinctions
Prehistoric Hyperoartia genera